Stochastic approximation methods are a family of iterative methods typically used for root-finding problems or for optimization problems. The recursive update rules of stochastic approximation methods can be used, among other things, for solving linear systems when the collected data is corrupted by noise, or for approximating extreme values of functions which cannot be computed directly, but only estimated via noisy observations. 

In a nutshell, stochastic approximation algorithms deal with a function of the form 
which is the expected value of a function depending on a random variable . The goal is to recover properties of such a function  without evaluating it directly.

Recently, stochastic approximations have found extensive applications in the  fields of statistics and machine learning, especially in settings with big data. These applications range from stochastic optimization methods and algorithms,  to online forms of the  EM algorithm, reinforcement learning via temporal differences, and deep learning, and others.
Stochastic approximation algorithms have also been used in the social sciences to describe collective dynamics: fictitious play in learning theory and consensus algorithms can be studied using their theory. 

The earliest, and prototypical, algorithms of this kind are the Robbins–Monro and Kiefer–Wolfowitz algorithms introduced respectively in 1951 and 1952.

Robbins–Monro algorithm
The Robbins–Monro algorithm, introduced in 1951 by Herbert Robbins and Sutton Monro, presented a methodology for solving a root finding problem, where the function is represented as an expected value. It is assumed that while we cannot directly observe the function , we can instead obtain measurements of the random variable  where . The structure of the algorithm is to then generate iterates of the form:

Here,  is a sequence of positive step sizes.
  is uniformly bounded,
  is nondecreasing,
  exists and is positive, and
 The sequence  satisfies the following requirements:
 

Complexity results
They have also proven that this rate cannot be improved.

Subsequent developments and Polyak–Ruppert averaging
While the Robbins–Monro algorithm is theoretically able to achieve  under the assumption of twice continuous differentiability and strong convexity, it can perform quite poorly upon implementation. This is primarily due to the fact that the algorithm is very sensitive to the choice of the step size sequence, and the supposed asymptotically optimal step size policy can be quite harmful in the beginning.

Lai and Robbins designed adaptive procedures to estimate  such that  has minimal asymptotic variance. However the application of such optimal methods requires much a priori information which is hard to obtain in most situations. To overcome this shortfall, Polyak (1991) and Ruppert (1988) independently developed a new optimal algorithm based on the idea of averaging the trajectories. Polyak and Juditsky also presented a method of accelerating Robbins–Monro for linear and non-linear root-searching problems through the use of longer steps, and averaging of the iterates. That is

A1) Therefore, the sequence  with  satisfies this restriction, but  does not, hence the longer steps. Under the assumptions outlined in the Robbins–Monro algorithm, the resulting modification will result in the same asymptotically optimal convergence rate  yet with a more robust step size policy. Prior to this, the idea of using longer steps and averaging the iterates had already been proposed by Nemirovski and Yudin for the cases of solving the stochastic optimization problem with continuous convex objectives and for convex-concave saddle point problems. These algorithms were observed to attain the nonasymptotic rate .

A more general result is given in Chapter 11 of Kushner and Yin by defining interpolated time , interpolated process  and interpolated normalized process  as

Let the iterate average be  and the associate normalized error to be .

satisfied, and define . Then for each ,

The success of the averaging idea is because of the time scale separation of the original sequence  and the averaged sequence , with the time scale of the former one being faster.

Application in stochastic optimization 
Suppose we want to solve the following stochastic optimization problem

Here  can be interpreted as some "observed" cost as a function of the chosen  and random effects .

In some special cases when either IPA or likelihood ratio methods are applicable, then one is able to obtain an unbiased gradient estimator . However, for some applications we have to use finite-difference methods in which  has a conditional expectation close to  but not exactly equal to it.

We then define a recursion analogously to Newton's Method in the deterministic algorithm:

Convergence of the algorithm 

C1)   

C2)  

C3)  

C4) 

C5) 

 

Then  converges to  almost surely.

Here are some intuitive explanations about these conditions. Suppose  is a uniformly bounded random variables. If C2) is not satisfied, i.e. As for C3) note that if  converges to  then

 so we must have  ，and the condition C3) ensures it. A natural choice would be .

Example (where the stochastic gradient method is appropriate) 
We can choose

Kiefer–Wolfowitz algorithm
The Kiefer–Wolfowitz algorithm was introduced in 1952 by Jacob Wolfowitz and Jack Kiefer, and was motivated by the publication of the Robbins–Monro algorithm. However, the algorithm was presented as a method which would stochastically estimate the maximum of a function. Let  be a function which has a maximum at the point . It is assumed that  is unknown; however, certain observations , where , can be made at any point . The structure of the algorithm follows a gradient-like method, with the iterates being generated as follows:

The sequence  specifies the sequence of finite difference widths used for the gradient approximation, while the sequence  specifies a sequence of positive step sizes taken along that direction.
  for all .
 The function  has a unique point of maximum (minimum) and is strong concave (convex)
 The algorithm was first presented with the requirement that the function  maintains strong global convexity (concavity) over the entire feasible space. Given this condition is too restrictive to impose over the entire domain, Kiefer and Wolfowitz proposed that it is sufficient to impose the condition over a compact set  which is known to include the optimal solution.
The function  satisfies the regularity conditions as follows:
 There exists  and  such that 
 There exists  and  such that  
 For every , there exists some  such that 
The selected sequences  and  must be infinite sequences of positive numbers such that

Subsequent developments and important issues
The Kiefer Wolfowitz algorithm requires that for each gradient computation, at least  different parameter values must be simulated for every iteration of the algorithm, where  is the dimension of the search space. This means that when  is large, the Kiefer–Wolfowitz algorithm will require substantial computational effort per iteration, leading to slow convergence.
 To address this problem, Spall proposed the use of simultaneous perturbations to estimate the gradient. This method would require only two simulations per iteration, regardless of the dimension .
In the conditions required for convergence, the ability to specify a predetermined compact set that fulfills strong convexity (or concavity) and contains the unique solution can be difficult to find. With respect to real world applications, if the domain is quite large, these assumptions can be fairly restrictive and highly unrealistic.

Further developments
An extensive theoretical literature has grown up around these algorithms, concerning conditions for convergence, rates of convergence,  multivariate and other generalizations, proper choice of step size, possible noise models, and so on.   These methods are also applied in control theory, in which case the unknown function which we wish to optimize or find the zero of may vary in time. In this case, the step size  should not converge to zero but should be chosen so as to track the function., 2nd ed., chapter 3

C. Johan Masreliez and R. Douglas Martin were the first to apply 
stochastic approximation to robust estimation.

The main tool for analyzing stochastic approximations algorithms (including the Robbins–Monro and the Kiefer–Wolfowitz algorithms) is a theorem by Aryeh Dvoretzky published in the proceedings of the third Berkeley symposium on mathematical statistics and probability, 1956.

See also
Stochastic gradient descent
Stochastic variance reduction

References

Stochastic optimization
Statistical approximations